Cortlandt may refer to:

Places
Cortlandt, New York, a town in Westchester County, New York
 Cortlandt (Metro-North station)
 Cortlandt Manor, New York, an area of the town
 Cortlandt Town Center, a shopping center in the town
Cortlandt Street (Manhattan), a street in New York City

 New York City Subway stations:
Cortlandt Street (BMT Broadway Line)
Cortlandt Street (IRT Broadway – Seventh Avenue Line), demolished in the September 11th attacks
Cortlandt Street (IRT Ninth Avenue Line)
Cortlandt Street (IRT Sixth Avenue Line)

People
Cortlandt F. Bishop (1870–1935), American pioneer aviator, autoist, book collector, and traveler
Cortlandt V.R. Schuyler (1900–1993), United States Army four-star general
Cortlandt Skinner (1727–1799), Royal Attorney General of New Jersey and American Revolutionary general
Cortlandt Starnes (1864–1934), seventh commissioner of the Royal Canadian Mounted Police
Jacobus Van Cortlandt (1658–1739), wealthy merchant and mayor of New York City
Philip Van Cortlandt (1749–1831), American surveyor, landowner, and politician from New York
Pierre Van Cortlandt (1721–1814), first Lieutenant Governor of the State of New York
Stephanus Van Cortlandt (1643–1700), first native-born mayor of New York City
Cortlandt Van Rensselaer (1808–1860), US Presbyterian clergyman

Arts, entertainment, and media

Fictional characters
Members of a fictional family on the soap opera All My Children:
Nina Cortlandt
Opal Cortlandt
Palmer Cortlandt
Pete Cortlandt
Pierre Cortlandt

Music
Cortlandt (album), a 1996 album by Sean Malone

See also
Cortland (disambiguation)
Courtland (disambiguation)
Van Cortlandt (disambiguation)